La Libre Esthétique (French; "The Free Aesthetics") was an artistic society founded in 1893 in Brussels, Belgium to continue the efforts of the artists' group Les XX dissolved the same year. To reduce conflicts between artists invited or excluded, artists were no longer admitted to the society, thus all exhibitors were now invited.

The first annual exhibition was opened on 14 February 1894, and the exhibition of 1914 was the last: a year later German troops had occupied Belgium, Brussels included.

The Annual Exhibitions, 1894-1913
All exhibitions were accompanied by a bibliophile catalogue, printed at Veuve Monnon, Brussels.

1894
 First exhibition, 17 February - 15 March 1894
Paul Gauguin showed five paintings, one from Martinique 1887, the others from his trip to Tahiti, 1891-1893. He even traveled to Brussels to assist at the opening, and published a review. Another artist showing works at the exhibition was Eugène Laermans.

1896
 Third exhibition, 22 February - 30 March 1896

1897
 Fourth exhibition, 25 February - 1 Avril 1897
With six recent paintings by Gauguin.

1898
 Fifth exhibition, 24 February - 1 April 1898

Resources

Footnotes

Bibliography
 Madeleine Octave Maus: Trente années de lutte pour l'art, Librairie L'Oiseau bleu, Bruxelles 1926; reprinted by Éditions Lebeer Hossmann, Bruxelles 1980
 Les XX & La Libre Esthétique: Honderd jaar later/Cent ans après, Brussels 1993  no ISBN

Belgian artist groups and collectives
19th-century art groups
1893 establishments in Belgium
1914 disestablishments in Belgium
Art exhibitions in Belgium